The 2019 Outback Bowl was a college football bowl game played on January 1, 2019. It was the 33rd edition of the Outback Bowl, and one of the 2018–19 bowl games concluding the 2018 FBS football season. The game was sponsored by Outback Steakhouse and played at Raymond James Stadium in Tampa, Florida.

Teams
The game featured the Iowa Hawkeyes of the Big Ten Conference and the Mississippi State Bulldogs of the Southeastern Conference. It was the first meeting between the two teams. It was Iowa's sixth time playing in the Outback Bowl, and Mississippi State's first.

Iowa Hawkeyes

Iowa received and accepted a bid to the Outback Bowl on December 2. The Hawkeyes entered the bowl with an 8–4 record (5–4 in conference).

It marked the sixth time in Kirk Ferentz's tenure as the Hawkeyes' head coach the team played in the Outback Bowl.

Mississippi State Bulldogs

Mississippi State received and accepted a bid to the Outback Bowl on December 2. The Bulldogs entered the bowl with an 8–4 record (4–4 in conference).

Game summary

Scoring summary

Statistics

References

External links

Box score at ESPN

Outback Bowl
ReliaQuest Bowl
2019 Outback Bowl
2019 Outback Bowl
Outback Bowl
Outback Bowl